Carl Ringdahl Sumner (September 28, 1908 – February 8, 1999) was a Major League Baseball player.  'Lefty' was born in Cambridge, Massachusetts, and lived in the state until his death in Chatham, Massachusetts.

Sumner played for the Boston Red Sox for 16 games in the 1928 season when the club finished dead last in the American League.

References

External links
 Baseball Almanac
 Baseball Reference
 Retrosheet

Major League Baseball outfielders
Boston Red Sox players
1908 births
1999 deaths
Baseball players from Massachusetts